The Ashok Hotel is a five-star deluxe resort in the 50, Niti Marg, Diplomatic enclave of Chanakyapuri, New Delhi. This hotel is part of Ashok Group, owned by the India Tourism Development Corporation.

Description

The hotel has 550 guest rooms and houses the largest pillar-less convention hall in New Delhi where the iconic Dehlvi family hosted the Shama-Sushama Film Awards every year through the mid-twentieth century. Situated in the Chanakyapuri diplomatic enclave, it neighbors the official residence of the prime minister of India, and the British High Commission. It has hosted several royals and heads of state including, Queen Elizabeth II, Prince Aga Khan, Tito, Margaret Thatcher, President Bill Clinton, Che Guevara and Fidel Castro. The presidential suite was used for three years as the official residence of the Saudi Arabian ambassador.

The hotel is owned by ITDC, of which the Government of India owns a 87.03% stake. The hotel is named after emperor Ashoka The Great, who had conquered almost the entirety of the Indian subcontinent from c. 268 to 232 BCE.

History

The Ashok was built in 1956 by the first Prime Minister of India, Jawaharlal Nehru on 25 acres of parkland donated to the government by the prince regent of Jammu and Kashmir, Karan Singh and designed by architect E.B. Doctor. It is an Indo-Modernist architectural style landmark and was completed in 1956 to host world leaders and dignitaries for the ninth UNESCO conference held in New Delhi. Of the original 23 shareholders, 15 were rulers of princely states that had been recently merged into India, including the Maharaja of Nawanagar.

In 1968, Prime Minister Indira Gandhi hosted, a large banquet at Ashok Hotel to celebrate her son Rajiv's wedding to Sonia.

In the 1980s, film actor Shah Rukh Khan was known to frequent the hotel during the fledgling part of his career, and it served as the location for Yash Chopra's motion picture Chandni in 1989.

In the 1970s, Ashok hosted one of the first night clubs in New Delhi, called the Supper Club. Usha Uthup, Sharon Prabhakar, Hema Malini, Uday Shankar all performed at the venue prior to attaining stardom, and a notable scene from Laawaris (1981) starring Amitabh Bachchan was shot there.

The Ashok hotel received LEED Gold certification for  Building Operations and Maintenance in 2017.

In May 2019, directly following the Indian General elections, and prior to forming his next government Prime Minister Modi hosted a dinner chaired by Amit Shah, at Ashok Hotel for leaders of their NDA coalition. Those in attendance included Shiv Sena leader Uddhav Thackeray, Akal Dal leader Prakash Singh Badal, JD(U) leader Nitish Kumar union ministers Rajnath Singh and Nitin Gadkahri.

References 

Luxury hotels
Hotels in Delhi
State guesthouses
1956 establishments in Delhi